José Perramón Acosta (born October 17, 1946) is a former Spanish handball player. He competed in the 1972 Summer Olympics.

In 1972 he was part of the Spanish team which finished fifteenth in the Olympic tournament. He played all five matches.

References

1946 births
Living people
Sportspeople from Barcelona
Spanish male handball players
Olympic handball players of Spain
Handball players at the 1972 Summer Olympics
FC Barcelona Handbol players
BM Granollers players
Handball players from Catalonia